Oy Karelian Trains Ltd was a joint venture agreed on 23 November 2006 between Russian Railways (RZhD) and VR Group (Finnish Railways) to facilitate the operation of international express passenger rail services between Helsinki, Finland, and Saint Petersburg, Russia. Karelian Trains was registered in Helsinki; VR and RZhD both owned 50% of the shares. The services are branded as Allegro.

Services were launched on 12 December 2010 using Alstom Pendolino trains ordered in September 2007. Investments will also be made in infrastructure to enable higher speeds to be achieved. Together, this has cut journey times between the two cities from the previous  hours to 3 hours and 27 minutes. There are four daily train departures each direction, compared to two for the older service. The daily locomotive-hauled night train Helsinki–Moscow (branded as Tolstoi) will continue like before.
 
Travel visas are required for many foreign nationals, including Finns, to enter Russia and for Russians to enter Finland. Passport and customs checks are conducted on board the trains. Traditionally the passport and customs checks have delayed the trains by at least 30 minutes according to the time table (1 hour for 30 km Vyborg-the border).

During the first year of operation the service has had 280,000 passengers, far more than expected.

Rolling stock

The service between Helsinki and St. Petersburg was provided using four Alstom-built Pendolino trains similar in interior fitting and exterior appearance to the VR Class Sm3 Pendolino trains that have been operated by the VR since 1995. The new trains, branded Allegro, are dual voltage, capable of operating on VR's 25 kV AC and RZhD's 3 kV DC electrification systems. The Allegro trains are painted in a new livery inspired by the colours of the flags of Finland and Russia, with blue and red stripes on a white and silver background, and a blue undercarriage.

See also
Finland station
Helsinki Central railway station
Riihimäki – Saint Petersburg Railway

References

VR press release
VR press release, December 2008
Alstom press release
Images of Allegro

External links
Karelian Trains

Railway companies of Finland
Railway lines in Russia
Railway companies established in 2006